Trini Kwan is a fictional character from the Power Rangers franchise, first appearing in the original series as the Yellow Ranger. She was portrayed by Vietnamese-American actress Thuy Trang.

Trini was originally portrayed by actress Audri Dubois in the unaired pilot episode, but when the show was picked up for television, for which a new pilot was filmed, she was played by Trang, around whom the character was rewritten. A reimagined version of Trini appears in the 2017 reboot film, played by Mexican-American singer Becky G.

Character biography

Mighty Morphin Power Rangers

Season 1
In Mighty Morphin Power Rangers, Trini makes her first appearance performing a Kata on the first episode. When Rita Repulsa escapes and begins wreaking havoc on earth, Trini, along with her close friends Jason Lee Scott, Zack Taylor, Billy Cranston and Kimberly Hart, is one of the five teens chosen by Zordon to receive a great power, drawn from the spirits of the prehistoric animals. These powers give them the ability to transform into a fighting force known as the Power Rangers. Trini is chosen for her compassion, quick wits, and martial arts talent, and becomes the Yellow Power Ranger, given the Saber-Toothed Tiger Power Coin and the Saber-Toothed Tiger Dinozord.

Trini is well-versed in kung fu. She would later become proficient in the art of Praying Mantis Kung Fu, mirroring Thuy Trang's real-life training in the martial art. Trini's signature fighting style included lightning-fast maneuvers, and powerful high kicks. She attempts to neutralize foes with the least amount of force. Trini is one of the intellectuals of the team, often having to translate Billy's techno talk for the other Rangers.

Generally soft-spoken and polite, Trini is a calm and warm person. She is an environmentalist. She is prepared to both push herself and put herself in danger for those she loves.

Season 2
In Season 2, with the arrival of new nemesis Lord Zedd, the Rangers are given the new Thunderzords to battle Zedd's monsters, which are significantly more powerful than those created by Rita. Trini is given the new Griffin Thunderzord.

Also, during the earlier part of the season, Trini is courted by a new student in school named Richie. Initially, they both are too nervous to speak to each other, but eventually Richie gathers the courage to ask Trini on a study date.

2017 film

In the 2017 film, which is a modern-day reboot of the original Power Rangers series, Trini is portrayed by Mexican-American singer Becky G. She is depicted more closely to as originally going for the television series as a teen of Mexican origin. The film also portrays her as a closeted lesbian, and as such, she has gained fame for being the first gay superhero in film. Trini reveals that Angel Grove is her third school in three years as her family often moved around, but she tends to avoid interaction with others, to the extent that she has been in Kimberly's biology class for a year and Kimberly never noticed her. Trini's issues are made worse by her family's relative normality, as her parents are essentially incapable of acknowledging or accepting her sexuality. However, as she trains with the team, having met them while practicing martial arts in the mine where Billy found the Power Coins, despite them meeting Zordon and Alpha before Zack even asks for her name, she comes to form a closer bond with the group. When Rita attacks Trini on her own and "offers" to spare her if Trini will tell her the location of the Zeo Crystal, Trini warns the rest of the team. After they manage to morph into their ranger suits, Trini joins the other Rangers in attacking Goldar in their zords before they form the Megazord for the first time.

Comics

Mighty Morphin Power Rangers: Pink
Kimberly is the main character in this comic book mini series published by Boom! Studios. The series is a modern-day remake but also serves as a continuation from Kimberly's exit in the third season of Mighty Morphin Power Rangers. Kimberly needs to rescue a French town under siege from Goldar. She seeks help from Zordon who uses the Sword of Light to activate the latent pink energy within her. Kimberly then teleports to Zack and Trini in South America for their help. Zordon uses the Sword of Light to share Kimberly's power with them. Trini once again becomes the Yellow Ranger. It is also revealed that Trini and Zack are in a relationship.

Development
The name Trini was originally used for the character "Trini Crystal" in a 1986 television pilot for an American adaptation of the Super Sentai series Choudenshi Bioman. Described as "an intellectual and struggling artist", the character was portrayed by American actress Tricia Leigh Fisher. Though Bioman was not picked up for a series, the character names of Trini, Zack, Kimberly, and Billy would later be used for Mighty Morphin' Power Rangers.

Early in Season 2, actress Thuy Trang injured her leg while performing a stunt on the show (the cast usually performed their own stunts). In particular, in the episode "The Beetle Invasion" she is notably seen sitting on a bench wearing a knee brace while the other Rangers played the game. Hence the character was unable to participate in most fight scenes and was often absent from other scenes that did not have something to sit on, for the rest of the actress's time on the series.

When Thuy Trang, Austin St. John (Jason), and Walter Jones (Zack) left the show (over contract disputes), their characters stopped making new on-screen or face-to-camera shots, simply being shown in their Ranger uniforms, using archive footage, or with doubles who were not directly facing the cameras, before they were written off in the two-part "Power Transfer" episode in which their characters were chosen to attend the World Peace Conference. Trini urged Zordon that they could not leave during such a crisis, but Zordon advised the transfer the best decision to make. The Sword of Light transferred Trini's powers to Aisha Campbell. Though Jason later returned in Power Rangers Zeo, Turbo: A Power Rangers Movie, and the tenth anniversary special "Forever Red," it was never stated what became of Zack or Trini after the peace conference.

Unlike Kimberly, Trini did not wear a skirt with her Ranger suit and appears with male anatomical contours in most morphed sequences. This is because the action scenes from the first season of Mighty Morphin used footage from the 1992 Super Sentai television series Kyōryū Sentai Zyuranger. Her counterpart on Zyuranger, Boi, the Tiger Ranger (portrayed by ), was male. However, a female version of the Tiger Ranger costume was made with a skirt for the 2011 Super Sentai series Kaizoku Sentai Gokaiger, which first appears on the show in Episode 11 due to Luka Millfy/Gokai Yellow being female.

Reception
The choice of color for the Black Ranger (Zack Taylor) and Yellow Ranger (Trini Kwan) has been a source of criticism, due to the belief these colors are representations of their racial backgrounds. There are many parodies illustrating the perceived inherent racism of the show. According to the producers, this was not noticed until the tenth episode of Mighty Morphin Power Rangers.

Notes

References

Further reading
 The Official Mighty Morphin Power Rangers Guidebook,

External links
 Official Power Rangers website

Power Rangers characters
Mighty Morphin Power Rangers
Television characters introduced in 1993
Fictional Tang Láng Quán practitioners
Fictional female martial artists
Fictional knife-fighters
American superheroes
Asian-American superheroes
Latin American superheroes
LGBT superheroes
Superhero television characters
Teenage characters in television
Female superheroes
Fictional LGBT characters in film
Fictional lesbians
Fictional Mexican-American people